Intergamma is a Dutch franchise-organisation. It owns two hardware store-chains, namely Gamma and Karwei. Intergamma started on May 11, 1971 with a Gamma store in Breda. Its current CEO is Harm-Jan Stoter.

, Intergamma had 373 stores – 245 Gamma stores, of which 164 are located in the Netherlands, 81 in Belgium, and 128 Karwei stores, all of which are located in the Netherlands.

In 2008 Intergamma had a revenue of 998 million euro. Gamma had a revenue of 606 million euro and Karwei 392 million.

Intergamma has about 370 personnel and have locations in Leusden (headquarters) and Antwerp.

References

External links 
 

Retail companies established in 1971
Companies based in Utrecht (province)
Leusden
Antwerp